Brianne Desa (born 6 July 2000) is a footballer who plays as a midfielder for League1 Ontario club Simcoe County Rovers. Born in Canada, she represents Guyana at the international level.

Early life
A native of Pickering, Ontario, Desa played youth soccer with Pickering FC, Markham SC and FC Durham Academy.

College career
In 2018, Desa attended Brock University, playing for the women's soccer team. She scored two goals in her debut on August 24 in a 2-1 victory over the Waterloo Warriors. She was named an OUA Second Team All Star after leading Brock with five goals on the season.

Afterwards, she began attending Seneca College, where she played for the women's soccer team.

Club career
In 2017, she played for Durham United FA in League1 Ontario, appearing in three matches. She returned to the side in 2019, appearing in nine matches

In 2021, she played for Vaughan Azzurri in League1 Ontario, appearing in 11 league games, scoring once against Hamilton United on October 14. She scored in the playoff semi-final match against Woodbridge Strikers, who defeated Vaughan in a penalty shootout. She was named a league Second Team All Star.

In 2022, she joined the Simcoe County Rovers. She scored her first goal on April 30 against Alliance United. She was named a league Second Team All-Star in 2022.

International career
Desa represents the Guyana women's national football team.

International goals
Scores and results list Guyana's goal tally first

References

External links
 

2000 births
Living people
Citizens of Guyana through descent
Guyanese women's footballers
Women's association football midfielders
Guyana women's international footballers
People from Pickering, Ontario
Soccer people from Ontario
Canadian women's soccer players
Canadian sportspeople of Guyanese descent
Vaughan Azzurri (women) players
Pickering FC (women) players
League1 Ontario (women) players
Simcoe County Rovers FC players
Seneca College alumni